Eucriotettix is a genus of ground-hoppers (Orthoptera: Caelifera) in the tribe Thoradontini.  Species have been recorded from tropical Asia: India, Indochina, through to New Guinea.

Species 
The Catalogue of Life and Orthoptera Species File list:
Eucriotettix aequalis Hancock, 1912
Eucriotettix amplifemurus Zheng, 1998
Eucriotettix anisyutkini Storozhenko & Dawwrueng, 2015
Eucriotettix annandalei Hancock, 1915
Eucriotettix aptus Bolívar, 1898
Eucriotettix bolotettigiellus Günther, 1938
Eucriotettix brachynotus Zheng & Jiang, 1997
Eucriotettix curvinotus Deng, 2016
Eucriotettix dammermanni Günther, 1938
Eucriotettix dyscheres Günther, 1939
Eucriotettix edithae Kaltenbach, 1979
Eucriotettix exsertus Bolívar, 1902
Eucriotettix flavopictus Bolívar, 1902
Eucriotettix grandis Hancock, 1912
Eucriotettix guipingensis Li, Zheng & Lu, 2000
Eucriotettix hainanensis Günther, 1938
Eucriotettix interrupta Deng, Zheng & Wei, 2006
Eucriotettix longidorsalis Zheng & Ou, 2011
Eucriotettix longipennis Deng, Zheng & Wei, 2007
Eucriotettix maculatus (Kirby, 1914)
Eucriotettix magnus (Hancock, 1907)
Eucriotettix molestus (Günther, 1938)
Eucriotettix montanus (Hancock, 1912)
Eucriotettix neesoon Tan & Storozhenko, 2018
Eucriotettix nigripennis Deng & Zheng, 2012
Eucriotettix nigritibialis Zheng & Shi, 2009
Eucriotettix oculatus (Bolívar, 1898)
Eucriotettix peregrinus (Günther, 1938)
Eucriotettix ridleyi Günther, 1938
Eucriotettix rufescens (Kirby, 1914)
Eucriotettix simulans Tan & Storozhenko, 2017
Eucriotettix spinilobus Hancock, 1904
Eucriotettix strictivertex Deng & Zheng, 2012
Eucriotettix superfluus (Günther, 1936)
Eucriotettix tenuis (Günther, 1936)
Eucriotettix thienemanni Günther, 1938
Eucriotettix torulisinotus Li, Deng, Zheng & Wei, 2014
Eucriotettix tricarinatus (Bolívar, 1887) - type species (as Criotettix tricarinatus Bolívar: India)
Eucriotettix tridentatus Li, Deng, Zheng & Wei, 2014
Eucriotettix wuliangshanensis Zheng & Ou, 2003

References

External links 
 

Tetrigidae
Caelifera genera
Orthoptera of Asia